Daviesia laevis is a species of flowering plant in the family Fabaceae and is endemic to the Grampians in Victoria, Australia. It is an open, erect shrub with arching branchlets, scattered narrow elliptic to linear phyllodes and orange-yellow and brownish-red flowers.

Description

Taxonomy and naming
Daviesia inflata was first formally described in 1991 by Michael Crisp in Australian Systematic Botany from specimens collected in the Mount Difficult Range in 1989. The specific epithet (laevis) means "smooth".

Distribution and habitat
This daviesia grows in sheltered montane gullies, in open forest or tea-tree thickets near streams and is found in isolated populations in the Grampians and nearby ranges of Victoria.

Conservation status
Daviesia laevis is listed as "vulnerable" under the Australian Government Environment Protection and Biodiversity Conservation Act 1999 and the Victorian Government Flora and Fauna Guarantee Act 1988, and a National Recovery Plan has been prepared. The main threats to the species include inappropriate fire regimes, grazing by kangaroos and its low population size.

References

laevis
Flora of Victoria (Australia)
Plants described in 1991
Taxa named by Michael Crisp